Andreas Palaiologos or Andrew Palaeologus may refer to:

 Andreas Palaiologos (fl. 1342–1349), leader of the Zealots of Thessalonica
 Andreas Palaiologos (1453–1502), titular Emperor of Constantinople 1483–1494, 1498–1502 and Despot of the Morea 1465–1502
 Andreas Palaiologos (son of Manuel) (fl. 1520), son of Manuel Palaiologos